Vizille is a commune in the Isère department in southeastern France.

Population

Sights
Vizille is the home of the Musée de la Révolution française, a rich depository of archival and rare materials devoted to the French Revolution, housed since 1984 in the Château de Vizille, a historic monument.

The chateau, the grandest in the Dauphiné,  was rebuilt in the form it retains today in the seventeenth century by François de Bonne, duc de Lesdiguières, the last Connétable de France. A hundred hectares of greens, sheets of water and canals, and a hunting park of woodland pierced by rides and avenues surround the château, enclosed by a wall seven kilometres in circumference. The grounds are maintained by the Conseil général de l'Isère.

The site is especially suitable for its museum because, when the château had been purchased by a wealthy bourgeois of Grenoble, Claude Perier, who installed a manufacturer of printed fabrics in it, the three estates of the realm, convoked in Grenoble as the Assemblée des notables but forbidden to meet in the city, were welcomed here, 21 July 1788. They met in the salle du jeu de paume, where their deliberations opened a new chapter in the history of France.

See also
Communes of the Isère department

References

Communes of Isère
Isère communes articles needing translation from French Wikipedia